The 1977 season of 2. deild karla was the 12th season of third-tier football in Iceland.

Group A

Group B

Group C

Group D

Group E

Group F

Final round

Group A

Group B

Promoted teams

Both Fylkir and Austri won promotion to the 1978 1. deild karla. No final took place, with Fylkir declared champions.

References
 

2. deild karla seasons
Iceland
Iceland
3